"A solis ortus cardine..." (Latin for "From the Pivot of the Sun's Rising") is a poem by Coelius Sedulius (died c. 450), recounting Christ's life from his birth to his resurrection. Its 23 verses each begin with a consecutive letter of the Latin alphabet, making the poem an abecedarius. It is one of the oldest parts of the Roman Catholic liturgy, with two hymns formed from the first seven and four later  verses. There have been monastic translations into Anglo-Saxon and later translations into other languages, most notably the German versification of Martin Luther during the Reformation. The original Latin hymn and Luther's translation have been set for chorus and organ by many composers including Dufay, di Lasso, Praetorius, Palestrina, Scheidt, de Grigny and Bach.

History
 
A solis ortus cardine... is a Latin hymn, written in the first half of the fifth century by the early Christian poet Sedulius. The abecedarius recounts in 23 quatrains of iambic dimeter the nativity, miracles and passion of Christ. With the other Latin texts of Sedulius, it enjoyed wide circulation in the church and in schools from late antiquity and medieval times until the end of the seventeenth century. The opening words are cited by Bede in his De Arte Metrica and were used without reference by medieval poets; and the seventeenth verse Rivos cruoris torridi, describing Christ's miraculous healing of the bleeding woman, was even proffered as a medieval charm against bleeding.

The first seven verses, with a doxology verse by a different writer, were used from the early Middle Ages onwards as a Christmas hymn. They write of the striking contrast between the grandeur and omnipotence of the Word of God (the second person in the Trinity) and the vulnerable humanity of the child in whom the Word became flesh. In 1589, Palestrina set the odd verses (A,C,E,G) in Hymni totius anni secundum Sanctae Romanae Ecclesiae consuetudinem, necnon hymni religionum, a collection of hymns composed for the Vatican; liturgical practice was for the even verses to be sung in Gregorian plainchant.

A four-part setting of A solis ortus cardine, with the plainchant in the tenor, is annotated at the bottom of two pages from an early sixteenth century collection of madrigals and hymns in the Royal Library of Henry VIII (MS Royal Appendix 58). In early Tudor England, the Latin hymn was sung in three parts as a faburden with two voices added, one above and one below the plainchant. Polyphony of this kind became less common during the reign of Edward VI, when the English Reformation resulted in choirs being disbanded and organs dismantled.

Luther translated the first seven verses into the hymn "", which long remained the main German Protestant Christmas hymn until the new  of the 1990s, in which it did not appear. It was also set by Bach in his chorale cantata Christum wir sollen loben schon and his chorale prelude BWV 611.

Verses 8, 9, 11 and 13 of Sedulius' poem were also used, with an added doxology, as "Hostis Herodes impie..." ("O Herod, you impious foe..."), a hymn for the Epiphany. These verses narrate the story of Herod the Great and the Three Kings, along with the Baptism of Christ and the miracle at the wedding at Cana. Luther's translation of this hymn into German, as "Was fürchtst du, Feind Herodes, sehr", has long fallen out of use. The German-language Book of Hours also gives a translation of the verses 1, 2, 6 and 7 by Sedulius, plus a doxology, as "Vom hellen Tor der Sonnenbahn".

In the Catholic Liturgy of the Hours, the eight verse A solis ortus cardine and the five verse Hostis Herodes impie appear in the Latin original. Their early-church melody dates to the 5th century, beginning in the Dorian mode and ending in the Phrygian mode. Its numerous embellishments were later simplified, though most of them survive, even in Luther's versions. An almost syllabic version is in use in the modern Catholic liturgy.

Text
Below is the text of A solis ortus cardine with the eleven verses translated into English by John Mason Neale in the nineteenth century. Since it was written, there have been many translations of the two hymns extracted from the text, A solis ortus cardine and Hostis Herodes impie, including Anglo-Saxon translations, Martin Luther's German translation and John Dryden's versification.

Gallery

Notes

References

External links
, Gregorian chant (female)
, Gregorian chant (male)
, 15th century setting by Guillaume Dufay
Full poem by Sedulius
Free translation by Peter Gerloff (Verses 1, 2, 6, 7 and Doxology)
Text of Bach cantata 121

Christian liturgical music
Christmas carols
5th-century poems
Latin poems